National road 68 (abbreviated as DK68) is a main road of accelerated traffic belonging to the Polish national road network. The highway connects the Kukuryki border crossing on Belarus–Poland border with national road 2 in Wólka Dobryńska. It runs entirely in Lublin Voivodeship, in Biała County (Terespol and Zalesie gminas). According to signage, national road 68 is a component of European highway E30.

From February 14, 1986 until the road network reform in 2000, the route was signed as national road 812.

In the years 2005 – 2007, the road was reconstructed, as part of which, among others, the surface was renewed and strengthened to a load of 115 kN/axle. The stretch from Koroszczyn terminal to the border crossing is accessible only for large goods vehicles and overlaps with planned course of motorway A2.

Permissible axle load 
From November 15, 2005 the entire route is accessible for vehicles with single axle load up to 11.5 tons, while previously it was up to 10 tons.

Localities along the route 
 Kukuryki, border with Belarus
 Koroszczyn
 Wólka Dobryńska (road 2)

References 

68